Lojiba Simelane was the queen regent Indlovukati of Swaziland from 1836 after the death of Sobhuza I until 1840 when King Mswati II became the king.Lojiba Simelani's first born son prince Sononde was young during the death of his father. King Mswati II was made king for that reason. Sononde and his mother rebeled against the former Swati king's advisors and later chased out of Swaziland.

References

Women rulers in Africa
Swazi monarchs
19th-century monarchs in Africa
19th-century women rulers